The Rauher Jakob (literally "Rough James") is a hilltop between Tanne and Elend in the Harz mountains of central Germany. It is 568.6 metres above sea level. In the vicinity are the sources of the Spielbach and Allerbach, two tributary streams of the Warme Bode. The Ramsenhöhe is a sub-peak of the Rauher Jakob with a height of 565 metres AMSL.

References 

Mountains and hills of Saxony-Anhalt
Hills of the Harz